Hypercubane is a hypothetical polycyclic hydrocarbon with the chemical formula C40H24. It is a molecular analog of the four-dimensional hypercube or tesseract. Hypercubane possesses an unconventional geometry of the carbon framework. It has Oh symmetry like classic cubane C8H8. The structure is that of octamethyl cubane—a carbon attached to each corner of cubane itself—having each of those carbon substituents joined to each of its neighbors by an ethylene-1,2-diyl linker to form an outer cage. The edge of each inner core and its outer linker form a cyclohexene.

History 
Hypercubane was first proposed in 2014 by Pichierri and studied computationally by density functional theory. The initial model of hypercubane was constructed from octamethylcubane by removing unnecessary hydrogen atoms and adding the ethylene bridges as well as intercarbon bonds between the sp2 and sp3 atoms. To facilitate the future hypercubane spectroscopic identification chemical shifts for both 13C and 1H NMR-active nuclei have been calculated by Pichierri. Two years later, in 2016, studying the pyrolysis of hypercubane by means of tight-binding molecular dynamics simulations, Maslov and Katin demonstrated that hypercubane possessed high thermal stability comparable with the classic cubane C8H8. It was shown that hypercubane lifetime at room temperature tended to infinity. Therefore, it can be assumed that hypercubane is a kinetically stable molecular system. Among the possible hypercubane decomposition products at high temperatures (more than 1000 K) one can observe polycyclic airscrew-like hydrocarbon C34H18 based on three combined graphene fragments passivated by hydrogen atoms and three isolated acetylene molecules.

Synthesis 
To date, there has been no method describing the synthesis of hypercubane.

See also 
Basic zinc acetate and basic beryllium acetate, which have a structure resembling a 5-cell

References 

Hypothetical chemical compounds
Theoretical chemistry
Molecular geometry
Polycyclic nonaromatic hydrocarbons